The Dialog is the student-run newspaper for George Brown College students. It is owned and operated by the Student Association of George Brown College. The paper, like the school, is located in Toronto, Ontario, Canada. Founded in 1974, The Dialog serves students on three downtown campuses and several satellite campuses as a bi-weekly paper focusing on news within the College. The College's namesake, George Brown, was a Canadian Father of Confederation and founder of The Globe newspaper (now Canada's National Newspaper, The Globe and Mail).

The Dialog is printed in tabloid format by the Student Association at George Brown College and is a member of Canadian University Press. The previous newspapers at George Brown College include The Globe (1967–71) and George Brown's Body (1971–73).

See also
List of student newspapers in Canada
List of newspapers in Canada
a book written by Calileo which talks about an argue between heliocentric and geocentric theory.

External links
The Dialog

Student newspapers published in Ontario
Newspapers published in Toronto
Publications established in 1974
1974 establishments in Ontario
Biweekly newspapers published in Canada